Jaroslav Šifer (12 August 1895 – 29 November 1982) was a Yugoslav association football defender. He belonged to the first ever national team of Yugoslavia and took part at the 1920 Summer Olympics.

He played six games for the national team, including two matches at the 1920 Summer Olympics.</ref> At club level he played for Građanski Zagreb.<ref name="NFT">

Honours
Građanski
 Yugoslav First League (1): 1923
 Zagreb Regional Championship (5): 1919, 1920, 1923, 1923–24, 1924–25

References

External links
 

1895 births
1982 deaths
Footballers from Zagreb
People from the Kingdom of Croatia-Slavonia
Association football defenders
Yugoslav footballers
Yugoslavia international footballers
Olympic footballers of Yugoslavia
Footballers at the 1920 Summer Olympics
HŠK Građanski Zagreb players
Yugoslav First League players